Tornado! is a 1996 American made-for-television disaster film that is directed by Noel Nosseck and starring Bruce Campbell and Shannon Sturges and was aired on the Fox television network on May 7, 1996.

Plot
Jake Thorne (Bruce Campbell) is a storm chaser whose friend and former graduate school advisor, Dr. Joe Branson (Ernie Hudson), has developed a machine that may be able to provide earlier tornado warnings. Samantha Callen (Shannon Sturges) is a government auditor who must determine whether Dr. Branson's project warrants more funding. Jake has to try to convince Samantha that the machine is worthwhile. During the process, Jake and Samantha become romantically attracted to each other, but powerful tornadoes threaten the lives of all the major characters. The film ends with Jake's grandfather, Ephram, sacrifices himself to drive machine's disabled leg into soil. The tornado takes Ephram, while everyone in the storm cellar starts to clean up. Jake becomes upset that his grandfather died, but Samantha tells him that he saved their lives by fighting this tornado, and that Jake must never let anything like this happen again.

Cast
 Bruce Campbell as Jake Thorne
 Ernie Hudson as Dr. Joe Branson
 Shannon Sturges as Samantha Callen
 Bo Eason as "Tex" Fulton
 L. Q. Jones as Ephram Thorne
 Shannon Woodward as Lucy

Filming
Tornado! was filmed primarily in Austin, Texas, including scenes at local Fox Broadcasting Company affiliate KTBC. The film runs 89 minutes, and has been released on VHS, DVD and Netflix. It is rated PG for some perilous weather sequences, mild language, and sensuality.

See also
Twister, a 1996 theatrical release

References

External links

1996 films
American disaster films
Films with screenplays by John Logan
Films about tornadoes
1990s disaster films
Disaster television films
Fox network original films
Films shot in Austin, Texas
American television films
Sonar Entertainment films
Films directed by Noel Nosseck
1990s American films